The 4th Lok Sabha was in session from 4 March 1967 to 27 December 1970. Its members were elected in February and March 1967. 13 sitting members from the Rajya Sabha were elected to the 4th Lok Sabha in the general election.

Indira Gandhi was the Prime Minister as in the previous 3rd Lok Sabha. Her premiership would continue into the following Lok Sabha, the 5th, which was constituted after the 1971 Indian general election.

Important members
 Speaker:
Neelam Sanjiva Reddy from 17 March 1967 to 19 July 1969
Gurdial Singh Dhillon from 8 August 1969 to 19 March 1971
 Deputy Speaker:
Raghunath Keshav Khadilkar from 28 March 1967 to 1 November 1969
George Gilbert Swell from 9 December 1969 to 27 December 1970
Secretary General:
S. L. Shakdhar from 2 September 1964 to 18 June 1977

Membership by political party

References

External links

 Terms of the Lok Sabha
India MPs 1967–1970
1967 establishments in India
1970 disestablishments in India